Tadley is a town and civil parish in the English county of Hampshire.

During the 1950s and 1960s, the Atomic Weapons Research Establishment (AWRE), now known as AWE, became the area's largest employer, and many houses were built during this period to accommodate AWRE workers. Though the establishment was located in the parish of Aldermaston, most of these houses were built in Tadley.

History 

The origin of the name is uncertain. In old maps and books Tadley can be found spelled as Taddanleage, Tederlei, Titherley, Tudurley, Tadel and Taddeley. As with many other rural British communities, it is assumed that the village began as a clearing in the dense forest which at one time covered the greater part of England. In Old English, Tadde means 'Toad' or 'Frog' and ley being 'a clearing in the woods', so it possibly means "a clearing in the woods with frogs". Most sources, however, say that the name means "woodland clearing of a man called Tada".

In 909, Edward the Elder granted the 'Manor of Overton' to Frithstan, Bishop of Winchester. In the confirmation of this a wood at Tadley is mentioned. The village is mentioned frequently in documents relating to the grant. There was an independent estate in the parish called the 'Manor of Tadley' but later was known as the 'Manor of Withford or Wyford'. In 1166 this property was held by William Hotot. He was succeeded by his son, Robert Hotot in 1205. The first reference to a church at Tadley is in 1286 when Andrew Hotot is recorded as owning the Manor and Church. It could be assumed that a settlement and therefore a church existed at an earlier date in view of the documented references to owners of land at Tadley from 909.

Governance
Tadley is a civil parish with an elected town council Tadley Town Council which consists of 4 parish wards, Central Tadley, South Tadley, North Tadley and East Tadley. These occupy some or all of three wards of Basingstoke and Deane District Council, being Baughurst and Tadley North, Tadley Central and Tadley South. Tadley falls within the area of Basingstoke and Deane Borough Council and of Hampshire County Council and all three councils are responsible for different aspects of local government.

Geography
Tadley lies next to the northern border of Hampshire, where it meets West Berkshire.

Nearby villages are Aldermaston, Baughurst, Pamber Heath, Heath End, Bramley, Mortimer Common, and Silchester.

On the edge of Tadley is a Site of Special Scientific Interest (SSSI) called Ron Ward's Meadow With Tadley Pastures.

Economy
The growth in shopping facilities has been slower than the growth in the population. Though there are shops in small groups throughout the town, there is only one significantly-sized shop, a supermarket. For more extensive choice, it is necessary to go to one of the larger nearby towns, Basingstoke, Reading, or Newbury.

The main shopping areas in Tadley are on Mulfords Hill and Bishopswood Road, though there are isolated shops in other parts of the town and parish. A notable business in Mulfords Hill is that of the Royal Warrant Holder for Besom Brooms and Pea Sticks, also supplying besom brooms for the Harry Potter series of films.

Culture and community

Hampshire County Council built a new library for Tadley in 1994. It was opened on 12 October 1994 by Dame Mary Fagan, the Lord Lieutenant of Hampshire.

A local legend dating from the late 19th century claims that there were treacle mines located in the village, and until well into the 20th century the locals were referred to as "Tadley Treacle Miners". Tadley holds an annual "Treacle Fair" in honour of this legend in early June. It is organised by the Loddon Valley Lions Club, a member of Lions Club International.

Sport and leisure

Tadley has a Non-League football club Tadley Calleva F.C., which plays at Barlow's Park.

Transport

Road

Bus
Tadley is served by Stagecoach South with a regular service to Basingstoke.

Rail

Education
Children aged 11 to 16 that receive state-funded education are likely to attend The Hurst School, though this school is actually located in the adjacent village of Baughurst.

Primary schools in the area include: Bishopswood Infant and Junior Schools, Burnham Copse Primary School, Silchester Church of England Primary School, Tadley Community Primary School, and The Priory Primary School.

Notable residents
Dean Horrix, who achieved minor fame during the 1980s as part of the Reading football team that won promotion to the Football League Third Division in 1984 and the Football League Second Division in 1986, lived in Tadley with his wife Carol. He remained in the area after leaving Reading for Millwall in 1988 and being transferred to Bristol City in early 1990. He was killed in a car crash in March 1990, aged 27, less than two weeks after signing for Bristol City. His wife was driving the car but survived.

See also 
 List of places in Hampshire
 List of civil parishes in Hampshire

References

External links 
 Tadley and District History Society

 
Towns in Hampshire
Civil parishes in Hampshire
Basingstoke and Deane